Kroy Everett Nernberger (born February 27, 1984) is an American curler from Madison, Wisconsin.

Curling career 
Nernberger competed in three Junior National Championships, with his best finish at fourth place in 2002 and 2004. He has medaled at the Men's National Championship three times, all in a row on skip Craig Brown's team, silver in 2014 and 2015 and bronze in 2016. Later in 2016 Nernberger was invited to be alternate on the US Champion team, skipped by John Shuster, as they represented the United States at the World Championship. There they won the bronze medal, defeating Japan's Yusuke Morozumi in the bronze medal match.

Teams

Men's

Mixed

Mixed doubles

Private life
Kroy Nernberger attended University of Wisconsin–Madison. He works for Spectrum Brands and has some inventions.

He started curling in 1997, when he was 13 years old.

References

External links

Curling World Cup profile

Living people
1984 births
American male curlers
University of Wisconsin–Madison alumni
Sportspeople from Madison, Wisconsin
People from Medford, Wisconsin